2nd Earl of Liverpool may refer to:

Robert Jenkinson, 2nd Earl of Liverpool (1770–1828), 19th-century Prime Minister of the United Kingdom
Arthur Foljambe, 2nd Earl of Liverpool (1870–1941), first Governor-General of New Zealand